Kar Panbehi (also Romanized as Kar Panbehī; also known as Kar Panbeh) is a village in Runiz Rural District, Runiz District, Estahban County, Fars Province, Iran. At the 2006 census, its population was 17, in 4 families.

References 

Populated places in Estahban County